Tábara is a municipality located in the province of Zamora, Castile and León, Spain. According to the 2004 census (INE), the municipality has a population of 950 inhabitants. Tábara is the capital of the Tierra de Tábara comarca.

Tábara is located in the vicinity of the Sierra de la Culebra range, an important place for agritourism and wildlife watching.

Spanish poet León Felipe (1884–1968) was born in this town.

References

External links

Ayuntamiento de Tábara, Turismo – La Sierra de la Culebra

Municipalities of the Province of Zamora